Stockport County Ladies Football Club was founded in 1989/90 as Stockport County F.C then breaking away from Stockport County becoming an independent club called Stockport Ladies after the first season, the club remerged with Stockport County in 2000/2001.

This club play in the Women's National League North one (tier 4) since 2019. They won tier 5 in 2018/19 after drawing 1-1 and winning on penalties 4–3.  They also won the County Cup in 2018/2019.

The club play their home games at Stockport Sports Village.

References 

Women's football clubs in England